Rameshwar Teli is member of Bharatiya Janata Party and Member of Parliament, Lok Sabha from Dibrugarh (Lok Sabha constituency). He was also Minister of State in the Ministry of Food Processing Industries from 30 May 2019 to 7 July 2021. Now he is the Minister of State in the Ministry of Labour and Employment and The Ministry of Petroleum and Natural Gas since 7th July 2021.

Early life
He was born on 14 August 1970 in Duliajan in Assam. His father name is Budhu Teli and Mother Dulka Teli. He belongs to member of Tea-garden community of Assam. His father was a driver. During Teenage, he used to sell yam and fern to buy bread for snacks.

Career
He was local leader of All Assam Tea Tribe Students’ Association (AATTSA).
He was elected to Assam legislative Assembly during 2001-2006 and 2006-2011 for from Duliajan in district of Dibrugarh. He lost 2011 assembly elections by around 3000 votes to Amiya Gogoi.
In 2014, he was elected to as member of parliament from Dibrugarh as BJP candidate. In the 2019 Indian general election he was elected as a member of parliament from Dibrugarh constituency.

In May 2019, Teli became Minister of State for Food Processing Industries and worked till 7 July 2021.
In July 2021, Teli became Minister of State for Ministry of Petroleum and Natural Gas & Ministry of Labour and Employment in Second Modi ministry when cabinet overhaul happened.

References

 

Living people
India MPs 2014–2019
Assam MLAs 2006–2011
Lok Sabha members from Assam
People from Dibrugarh district
Bharatiya Janata Party politicians from Assam
1970 births
India MPs 2019–present
Narendra Modi ministry